Hyangga were poems written using Chinese characters in a system known as hyangchal during the Unified Silla and early Goryeo periods of Korean history. Only a few have survived: 14 in the Samguk yusa and 11 by the monk Kyunyeo.

Features 
Written using Hanja in a system known as hyangchal the hyangga are believed to have been first written in the Goryeo period, as the style was already beginning to fade. A collection of hyangga was compiled in the late 9th century by Wihong, the prime minister of Queen Jinseong of Silla, and the monk Taegu-Hwasang, but was since lost. The surviving hyangga consist of 14 recorded in the Samguk Yusa and 11 in the Gyunyeojeon by Kyunyeo.

The name hyangga is formed from the character for "back-country" or "rural village" – which was often used by the Silla people to describe their nation, specifically to distinguish these distinctly Silla poems from "pure" Chinese literature – and the character for "song". These poems are accordingly sometimes known as "Silla songs."

Eighteen of the 25 surviving hyangga reflect Buddhist themes.
Another dominant theme was death. Many of the poems are eulogies to monks, to warriors, and to family members — in one case, a sister. The Silla period, especially before unification in 668, was a time of warfare; the hyangga capture the sorrow of mourning for the dead while Buddhism provided answers about where the dead go and the afterlife.

Structure 
The structure of hyangga is incompletely understood. The only contemporaneous reference is a comment by the compiler of Gyunyeo's biography that "their poetry is written in Chinese in penta- and heptasyllabic lines, [while] our songs are written in the vernacular in three gu and six myeong". What is meant by "three gu and six myeong" remains unresolved; Peter H. Lee interprets it as "three-line stanzas of six phrases each", while Alexander Vovin translates it more literally as "three stanzas, six names".

Since the work of linguist Shinpei Ogura in the 1920s, surviving hyangga have traditionally been classified into one of three forms: a single-quatrain form used in folk songs; an intermediate two-quatrain form; and a ten-line form of two quatrains and a concluding couplet, the most fully developed form of hyangga. This classification has been questioned in Korean scholarship since the 1980s, and a new hypothesis, proposed by Kim Sung-kyu in 2016, suggests that there were really only two forms of hyangga: a single-quatrain form and a two-tercet form. Kim interprets two consecutive lines of the ten-line form as one long line with a caesura, and the so-called "concluding" couplet of the ten-line hyangga to be a refrain for each of the stanzas, thus forming two tercets with shared final lines. Kim further argues that apparently eight-line forms are the result of a line being lost during transmission.

The two hypotheses are illustrated below with the ten-line work Jemangmaega, written for the funeral of the poet's sister.

Example 
A typical hyangga is "The Ode for Life Eternal" (or, perhaps, "The Ode for Nirvana"), a song that calls upon the moon to convey the supplicant's prayer to the Western paradise, the home of Amita (or Amitabha, the Buddha of the Western Pure Land Sukhavati). The poem's authorship is somewhat unclear; it was either written by a monk named Gwangdeok or, one source says, the monk's wife.

List 

The 11 hyangga composed by Kyunyeo are:
 Yekyeong Jebul ga (Veneration of Buddhas)
 Chingchan Yorae ga (In Praise of Tathagata/Buddha)
 Gwangsu Gongyang ga (Abundant Offerings to Buddha)
 Chamhoe Opjang ga (Repentance of Sins and Retribution)
 Suhui Kongdeok ga (Rejoice in the Rewards of Virtue)
 Cheongjeon Beopyun ga (The Revolving Wheel of Law)
 Cheongbul Juse ga (Entreaty to the Coming of Buddha)
 Sangsun Bulhak ga (Faithful Observance of Buddha's Teachings)
 Hangsun Jungsaeng ga (Constant Harmony with Other Beings)
 Bogae Hoehyang ga (Salvation of All Living Beings)
 Chonggyeol Mujin ga (The Everlasting Conclusion)

See also 
 Sijo
 Gasa (poetry)
 Korean literature

Notes

References

Citations

Bibliography

External links 

Hyangga — World History Encyclopedia

Korean poetry
Korean literature